Island Lake Township is the name of some places in the U.S. state of Minnesota:
Island Lake Township, Lyon County, Minnesota
Island Lake Township, Mahnomen County, Minnesota

Minnesota township disambiguation pages